Wang Hao won the title in 2009 and was therefore the defending champion. He reached the final where he met fellow Chinese player Zhang Jike.

Zhang won against Hao 12–10, 11–7, 6–11, 9–11, 11–5, 14–12. This was the first time Zhang appeared in the Men's singles event at the World Championships and thus his first medal in this category.

Seeds
Based on the ITTF world ranking issued before the Championships, top 64 seeds directly enter first rounds of 128-player sized draw.

  Wang Hao (final)
  Timo Boll (semifinals)
  'Zhang Jike (World Champion)
  Ma Lin (quarterfinals)  Ma Long (semifinals)  Xu Xin (fourth round)  Jun Mizutani (quarterfinals)  Vladimir Samsonov (fourth round)  Wang Liqin (quarterfinals)  Joo Se-Hyuk (fourth round)  Oh Sang-Eun (fourth round)  Chen Qi (quarterfinals)  Ryu Seung-Min (fourth round)  Chuang Chih-yuan (second round)  Dimitrij Ovtcharov (fourth round)  Gao Ning (third round)  Tang Peng (third round)  Lee Jung-Woo (second round)  Patrick Baum (third round)  Bastian Steger (fourth round)  Alexey Smirnov (third round)  Christian Süß (first round)  Jörgen Persson (second round)  Chen Weixing (second round)  Jiang Tianyi (third round)  Adrian Crişan (second round)  Adrien Mattenet (fourth round)  Kenta Matsudaira (first round)  Seiya Kishikawa (third round)  Kim Min-Seok (third round)  Tiago Apolonia (first round)  Li Ching (first round)  Pär Gerell (second round)  Zoran Primorac (second round)  Jean-Michel Saive (second round)  Seo Hyun-Deok (second round)  Yang Zi (second round)  Bojan Tokič (second round)  Kirill Skachkov (second round)  Fedor Kuzmin (first round)  Marcos Freitas (first round)  Dmitrij Prokopcov (second round)  Jens Lundqvist (first round)  Andrej Gacina (second round)  Achanta Sharath Kamal (first round)  Panagiotis Gionis (third round)  Cho Eon-Rai (third round)  Cheung Yuk (second round)  Christophe Legout (first round)  Alexander Shibaev (third round)  Ko Lai Chak (third round)  He Zhi Wen (second round)  Petr Korbel (first round)  Evgueni Chtchetinine (second round)  Kazuhiro Chan (third round)  Robert Gardos (second round)  Carlos Machado (second round)  Emmanuel Lebesson (first round)  Damien Eloi (first round)  Igor Rubtsov (third round)  Zoltan Fejer-Konnerth (third round)  Thomas Keinath (second round)  Koki Niwa (second round)  Lucjan Błaszczyk (first round)''

Draw

Finals

Top half

Section 1

Section 2

Section 3

Section 4

Bottom half

Section 5

Section 6

Section 7

Section 8

References

External links
Main Draw

-